Jo Nam-jin is a North Korean military officer.

Biography
He is known to serve as the deputy director of the KPA General Political Department and head of the Organization Department of the Korean People's Army. He holds the rank of Colonel-General. He was a member of the funeral committee of Kim Yong-chun and of Kim Yang-gon.

References

North Korean generals
Workers' Party of Korea politicians